The Vettukad Church is also known as the Madre De Deus Church meaning Mother of God and is especially renowned among the pilgrims and tourists for the Feast of Christ the King celebration. Madre de Deus Church bears the tradition of more than 500 years. It is traditionally believed that the famous missionary, St. Francis Xavier, visited Vettukad somewhere between 1543 and 1547 to evangelize the faithful of the region. The letters written by Fr. Francis Peres S. J. addressed to the superior general of the society of Jesus in Rome in the year 1568 reveal that Madre De Deus Vettukad parish had a Christian population of 175. It is reported in the letter that when St. Francis Xavier reached Vettukad, he was amused to see a small chapel (japalayam) and a granite cross there.
This is a clear evidence of the fact that there existed a good number of faithful Christians in Vettukad long back from 15th century onwards.

At present, Vettukad has grown into a small township with a Christian population of 6770.

In 1934, during the period of Rev. Fr. Godwin A. Gudinho, started the construction of the present church and finished in 1937 during the period of Rev. Fr. Michael John. Then, the Vicar General of Kochi Diocese, Monsinjor Leon De Souza blessed the church and grew into a parish under Valiyathura forane and Roman Catholic Archdiocese of Trivandrum. Here Christ the King blesses with all His love and compassion and believed to have miraculous power over his devotees.

The Feast of Christ the King celebration lasts for 10 days, on the final day of which the grand feast takes place. It is celebrated on the last Sunday of the liturgical year corresponding to the third Sunday of November every year. During these ten days, a plethora of religious rites are performed all throughout the day. The second last day (Saturday) sees a grand procession with the image of Christ the King that goes round the entire parish. A high mass led by the Archbishop of Trivandrum Archdiocese, sermons, and the benediction marks the final day (Sunday) that experiences a spill of around 50,000 devotees.

Vettukad parishioners residing in the UAE has been celebrating Feast of Christ the King at St. Michael's Church, Sharjah, UAE since 1978.

In the United Kingdom, parishioners from Vettukad Church began to celebrate the Feast of Christ the King from November 2009.

Organizations 

The following charitable organizations actively work in Vettukad parish:

 KCYM (Kerala Catholic Youth Movement)
 Legion of Mary
 Sodality
 Vincent De Paul
 TSSS

Parish priest 

Rev. Dr. George Gomez

Former parish priests

Native priests 

 C. M. Hillary
 Rocky Fernandez
 Lazar Benedict
 Christil Rozario
 Edison Y.M.
 Rodrigus Kutty
 Binoy Leen. OFM Cap
 Joy .OFM Cap
 Aneesh Fernandez
 Binu Palakkapalli .IC
 -----
 Sajith Solaman 
 Arun .OFM Cap

seminariance
 Br. Vijin Vincent
 Br. Deepu Christepher
 Br. Pradeep Simon
 Br. Jibin James
 Br. Federick
 Br. Bijoy Judith
 Br. Alwin 
 .

Parish council 

The parish council is the governing body of the Madre De Deus Church. The parish council is elected every two years and functioning based on the bylaw approved by the Trivandrum Archdiocese. The parish council is chaired by the parish priest and it contains the vice president, secretary, treasurer, pastoral ministry convener, education ministry convener, social action ministry convener, youth ministry convener, B.C.C. coordinator and other council members elected from the wards.

Cemetery vault

Madre De Deus parish has built a new cemetery vault, which has a capacity of over one hundred coffins, during the period of Very. Rev. Fr. Johnson Alexander as parish priest. The foundation stone for the cemetery vault was laid on 19 March 2008 by Msgr. Eugine H Pereira and blessed on 1 November 2008 by Msgr. Rev. Dr. Nicholas T.

See also

—Jacob Nelson - http://jnelson.in 05:22, 19 July 2013 (UTC)

Roman Catholic churches in Thiruvananthapuram
|}